George Isaac "Mule" Armstrong (July 28, 1885 – April 27, 1954) was a Negro leagues catcher for several years before the founding of the first Negro National League.

While catching for the Buxton Wonders, a traveling team from Buxton, Iowa, Armstrong and teammate Lefty Pangburn were picked up by the St. Paul Colored Gophers where he played for two seasons in 1910 and 1911 (the second season the team changed their name to the Twin Cities Gophers).

In 1912, he and fellow players Dicta Johnson and Bee Seldon moved to the French Lick Plutos of Indiana. Armstrong and Bingo DeMoss moved to the Chicago Giants in the following year.

References

External links

1885 births
1954 deaths
People from West Elizabeth, Pennsylvania
Buxton Wonders players
Chicago Giants players
French Lick Plutos players
St. Paul Colored Gophers players
20th-century African-American people